"Lay My Lily Down" is a song written by Bob Weir, Josh Kaufman and Josh Ritter. It is the third single from Weir's third solo album, Blue Mountain. The producers are Josh Kaufman and Daniel Goodwin.

On September 12, 2016, the song had its premiere on NPR's World Cafe for streaming.

Weir wrote the song with Ritter and Kaufman, with lyrics in the voice of a father as he buries his daughter, over a mix of guitars. Weir described the song as the "brainchild of Josh Kaufman", incorporating the folksong "Lay My Corey Down". Weir tried to make the song "banjo-oriented", using the clawhammer banjo technique for his guitar playing.

Musicians
Bob Weir – Vocals, Guitar
Aaron Dessner – Electric Guitar
Scott Devendorf – Bass, Vocals
Ray Rizzo – drums, harmonium, harmonica, backup vocals
Josh Kaufman – lyrics
Rob Burger – keyboard, accordion, tuned percussion

References

Songs written by Bob Weir
2016 songs